House of Cardin is a 2019 Franco/American documentary film directed by P. David Ebersole and Todd Hughes. The film details the life and career of Pierre Cardin, the Italian-born French designer and futurist whose influence shaped the global economy and revolutionized the fashion industry. Chronicling Cardin’s humble beginnings, his immigration from Mussolini’s Italy and his coming of age in Nazi occupied France, the young tailor arrives in Paris in 1945 and begins his enchanted entrée into the world of haute couture by way of Jeanne Paquin, Jean Cocteau, Elsa Schiaparelli and Christian Dior. Opening his own house in 1950, Cardin eventually introduces prêt-à-porter and envisions future fashion. He establishes the power of the designer logo and takes his name in design to explore many avenues of lifestyle, including furniture, housewares and a record label. A frustrated actor, Cardin transitions into overseeing the long-running experimental theater/cultural center Espace Cardin  for half a century,  as well as developing an annual music and theater Festival de Lacoste while expanding his brand globally. Cardin’s personal relation with long-time partner Andre Oliver and his love affair with Jeanne Moreau are also explored.

The film’s score is written by James Peter Moffat and is produced by Cori Coppola. It premiered at the 2019 Venice Film Festival in the Giornate degli Autori with Mr. Cardin in attendance. The French premiere marked the first public event in Paris during the COVID-19 lockdowns at  Théâtre du Châtelet on September 15, 2020. It was purchased theatrically for Australia, New Zealand, France, Russia, Italy, Japan, Brazil, Spain and China and was released in the US through Utopia. House of Cardin swept the 2019 Cinémoi International Fashion Film Awards (IFFAs) winning the Lifetime Achievement Award for Pierre Cardin, Best Fashion Feature Film, Best Directors of a Fashion Feature film for P. David Ebersole and Todd Hughes and a nomination for Best Cinematography of a Fashion Feature Film.

Background
Filmmakers P. David Ebersole and Todd Hughes were in Paris to promote their documentary Mansfield 66/67 when they went to the Pierre Cardin Boutique on the rue du Faubourg Saint-Honoré hoping to get a photo with their idol. They were avid collector’s of the designer’s furniture and lifestyle design, even owning the AMC Javelin Cardin designed in 1972.   After a career of refusing to participate on a documentary, on September 6, 2017, Pierre Cardin chose Eberole and Hughes to produce and direct the authorized film about his life and career upon their first meeting at Minim’s, the brasserie of Cardin’s Maxim’s. The film subsequently premiered at the Venice Film Festival on September 6, 2019, exactly two years to the day later.

Cast

Pierre Cardin 
Jean-Paul Gaultier 
Philippe Starck 
Naomi Campbell 
Sharon Stone 
Guo Pei 
Jean-Michel Jarre 
Alice Cooper 
Dionne Warwick 
Kenzō Takada 
Jenny Shimizu 
Hanae Mori 
Trina Turk
Yumi Katsura
Rodrigo Basilicati Cardin
Maryse Gaspard
Renée Taponier
Claude Brouet
Amy Fine Collins
Laurence Benaïm
Tony Glenville
Matthew Gonder
Jean Pascal Hesse
Josée Dayan
Jeanne Moreau (archival footage)
Andre Oliver (archival footage)
Hiroko Matsumoto (archival footage)

References

External links

 House of Cardin: Futurist with and eye for expansion
 Harper’s Bazaar
 Vogue UK

American documentary films
2019 documentary films
2019 films
2019 LGBT-related films
American LGBT-related films
2010s English-language films
Films directed by P. David Ebersole
2010s American films